Belize maintains 14 embassies to foreign countries, one consulate, and three missions to international organizations. In 1990, Belize became a member of the Organization of American States, and the Commonwealth of Nations in 1981.

To strengthen its potential for economic and political development, Belize has sought to build closer ties with the Spanish-speaking countries of Central America to complement its historical ties to the English-speaking Caribbean states. Recent foreign policy initiatives include joining with the other Central American countries in signing the CONCAUSA Agreement on regional sustainable development and becoming a full member of the Central American Integration System (SICA). Belize is a member of CARICOM which was founded in 1973.

Diplomatic relations

Africa

Americas

Asia

Europe

Oceania

Belize and the Commonwealth of Nations

Belize has been a member state of the Commonwealth since 1981, when it became an independent Commonwealth realm.

King Charles III as King of Belize is viceregally represented by the Governor-General of Belize.

Multilateral membership 

Belize is a member of the following multilateral bodies.

African, Caribbean and Pacific Group of States (ACP)
The Agency for the Prohibition of Nuclear Weapons in Latin America and the Caribbean (OPANAL)
Caribbean Community (Caricom)
Caribbean Development Bank (CDB)
Commonwealth of Nations
Food and Agriculture Organization (FAO)
Group of 77 (G-77)
Inter-American Development Bank (IADB)
International Bank for Reconstruction and Development (IBRD)
International Civil Aviation Organization (ICAO)
International Confederation of Free Trade Unions (ICFTU)
International Red Cross and Red Crescent Movement (ICRM)
International Development Association (IDA)
International Fund for Agricultural Development (IFAD)
International Finance Corporation (IFC)
International Labour Organization (ILO)
International Monetary Fund (IMF)
International Maritime Organization (IMO)
Intelsat (nonsignatory user)
Interpol
International Olympic Committee (IOC)
International Organization for Migration (IOM) (observer)
International Telecommunication Union (ITU)
Non-Aligned Movement (NAM)
Organization of American States (OAS)
Latin American Economic System (LAES)
The United Nations (UN)
United Nations Economic Commission for Latin America and the Caribbean (UNECLAC)
United Nations Conference on Trade and Development (UNCTAD)
United Nations Educational, Scientific and Cultural Organization (UNESCO)
United Nations Industrial Development Organization (UNIDO)
Universal Postal Union (UPU)
World Confederation of Labour (WCL)
World Health Organization (WHO)
World Trade Organization (WTO)

See also

List of diplomatic missions in Belize
List of diplomatic missions of Belize
North American Free Trade Agreement
Free Trade Area of the Americas
Third Border Initiative
Caribbean Basin Initiative (CBI)
Caribbean Basin Trade Partnership Act
Western Hemisphere Travel Initiative

References

External links
Belizean High Commission in London, United Kingdom 
British High Commission in Belmopan
Embassy of Belize in Guatemala City, Guatemala
Embassy of Belize in Washington, D.C. 
Embassy of Republic of China (Taiwan) in Belize City
 United States Embassy in Belmopan
GAR
Other Documents
Submission of Belize/Guatemala Case to ICJ in 2009
Summary of Legal Opinion of 25 November 2008
Belize/Guatemala ICJ Compromis Signed at OAS in Washington, D.C. on 8 December 2008
Compromis
Videos
Photographs
Belize Leading Counsel of 19 December 2008
Dominican Republic
Address of the Belizean embassy in Santo Domingo
Russia
Bilateral treaties of Belize [pdf]
Belize
Belize tourism

 

 
Belize and the Commonwealth of Nations